Philippe Ronald Peter Boissevain (born 18 October 2000) is a Dutch international cricketer who made his debut for the Dutch national side in August 2019.

In July 2019, he was selected to play for the Amsterdam Knights in the inaugural edition of the Euro T20 Slam cricket tournament. Later the same month, he was named in the Dutch squad for the Twenty20 International (T20I) series against the United Arab Emirates. He made his T20I debut for the Netherlands against the United Arab Emirates on 5 August 2019.

In September 2019, he was named in the Dutch squad for the 2019 ICC T20 World Cup Qualifier tournament in the United Arab Emirates. He made his List A debut on 11 May 2021, for the Netherlands A team against the Ireland Wolves, during their tour of Ireland. Later the same month, he was named in the Dutch One Day International (ODI) squad for their series against Scotland. He made his ODI debut on 20 May 2021, for the Netherlands against Scotland.

In September 2021, Boissevain was named in the Dutch squad for the 2021 ICC Men's T20 World Cup.

References

External links

2000 births
Living people
Dutch cricketers
Netherlands One Day International cricketers
Netherlands Twenty20 International cricketers